Speculum: A Journal of Medieval Studies is a quarterly academic journal published by University of Chicago Press on behalf of the Medieval Academy of America. Established in 1926 by Edward Kennard Rand, it is widely regarded as the most prestigious journal in medieval studies. The journal's primary focus is on the time period from 500 to 1500 in Western Europe, but also on related subjects such as Byzantine, Hebrew, Arabic, Armenian and Slavic studies. , the editor is Katherine L. Jansen.

The organization and its journal were first proposed in 1921 at a meeting of the Modern Language Association, and the journal's focus was interdisciplinary from its beginning, with one reviewer noting a specific interest in Medieval Latin.

References

External links 

 
 Online access
 Tables of contents vols. 1 (1926) – 24 (1949)
 Tables of contents vols. 25 (1950) – 49 (1974)
 Tables of contents vols. 50 (1975) – 83 (2008)

History journals
Publications established in 1926
Medieval studies literature
English-language journals
Quarterly journals
Cambridge University Press academic journals
Academic journals associated with learned and professional societies